The Gjergj Kastrioti Skënderbeu decoration is a high honorary state decoration that is currently awarded to Albanian and foreign citizens in Albania, that have made an important contribution to the defence, reinforcement and development of the Republic of Albania.

The name refers to Skanderbeg, who is the national hero of the Albanian people. The Decoration is granted by the President of Albania. It should not be confused with the royal Order of Skanderbeg, which is a dynastic order bestowed by the Albanian royal family.

Recipients
Some recipients to date include:

 Sabah Al-Ahmad Al-Jaber Al-Sabah, Emir of Kuwait (decorated by President of Albania Bamir Topi on 27 May 2012).
 Anthony Bailey, Irish interfaith campaigner.
 Laura Boldrini, President of the Chamber of Deputies of Italy.
 Henry Brooke, retired British Court of Appeal judge.
 , former Member of the Landtag of Baden-Württemberg, and Chair of the Vereinigung für Grundwerte und Völkerverständigung ["Foundation for Basic Values and International Understanding"] (awarded by President Bujar Nishani in June 2017).
 Rosemary DiCarlo, American diplomat.
 Comte Jean d'Ogny (Commander), French politician (2008).
 Yuli Edelstein, Israeli politician. 
 Sabri Godo, writer, screenwriter, politician (posthumously decorated by President of Albania Bujar Nishani on December 12, 2012).
 Azem Hajdari, assassinated Albanian politician (decorated posthumously by proposal of President Bamir Topi on 10 September 2008).
 Sabri Hamiti, Albanian writer and scholar from Kosovo (decorated by President Bamir Topi on 10 May 2010).
 Ramush Haradinaj, former Prime Minister of Kosovo.
 Hamad bin Khalifa Al Thani, Emir of Qatar (decorated by President Bamir Topi on 18 October 2011).
 Fatos Nano, former Prime Minister of Albania (decorated by proposal of President Alfred Moisiu).
 Giorgio Napolitano, President of the Republic of Italy (2014).
 Doris Pack, German politician, President of EPP Women and former Member of the European Parliament 1989–2014. 
 Colin Powell, retired US General, former Secretary of State (decorated on 1 May 2003 by proposal of President Alfred Moisiu). 
 Fatmir Sejdiu, President of Kosovo (decorated by President Bamir Topi on 3 November 2008).
 Ismail Serageldin, Vice President of the World Bank (1992-2000), Emeritus Librarian of the Bibliotheca Alexandrina.
 Aleksandar Stipčević, Croatian-Albanian historian and archaeologist.
 Cafo Beg Ulqini, former Mayor of Ulqin, Leader of Second League of Prizren (decorated by proposal of President Bujar Nishani in April 2016). 
 Abdullah bin Zayed Al Nahyan, UAE Foreign Minister (decorated by President of Albania Bujar Nishani on 14 March 2014).
 Igli Kokona, Distinguished General, served in World in Conflict* (decorated on 8 July 2022)

See also
Orders, decorations and medals of Albania

References

Decoration
Awards established in 1996
1996 establishments in Albania